Adigun is both a surname and a given name. Notable people with the name include:

 Adebayo Adigun (born 1990), Nigerian footballer
 Seun Adigun (born 1987), Nigerian hurdler
 Adigun Salami (born 1988), Nigerian footballer

References 

Yoruba-language surnames
Yoruba given names